Zavodskyi District is the name of several urban districts (raions) in Ukraine:

 Zavodskyi District, Kamianske, in Dnipropetrovsk Oblast, an Urban districts of Ukraine
 Zavodskyi District, Mykolaiv, in Mykolaiv Oblast, an Urban districts of Ukraine
 Zavodskyi District, Zaporizhia, in Zaporizhia Oblast

See also
 Zavodsky (disambiguation)
 Zavodsky City District (disambiguation)